Johannes Meier (born 24 September 1984) is a German former footballer who played as a defender.

Career
Meier made his professional debut in the 3. Liga for 1. FC Heidenheim on 25 July 2009, starting in the home match against Wuppertaler SV which finished as a 2–2 draw.

References

External links
 Profile at DFB.de
 Profile at kicker.de

1984 births
Living people
People from Kaufbeuren
Sportspeople from Swabia (Bavaria)
Footballers from Bavaria
German footballers
Association football defenders
SSV Ulm 1846 players
1. FC Heidenheim players
3. Liga players
Regionalliga players